The Gambia competed at the 2022 Commonwealth Games in Birmingham, England between 28 July and 8 August 2022. It was The Gambia's twelfth appearance at the Games.

Modou Gamo and Wurrie Njadoe were the country's opening ceremony flagbearers.

On 2nd August, judoka Faye Njie won the country's first Commonwealth Games silver medal and second Commonwealth medal ever (the first being a bronze medal at the 1970 Commonwealth Games).

Medalists

Competitors
The following is the list of number of competitors participating at the Games per sport/discipline.

Athletics

Men
Track and road events

Women
Track and road events

Beach volleyball

On 28 March 2022, The Gambia guaranteed qualification for the men's tournament by winning the African Qualifier in Accra, Ghana. The FIVB later confirmed they ultimately qualified directly via the World Rankings (for performances between 16 April 2018 and 31 March 2022).

Two players were selected as of 24 May 2022.

Men's tournament

Group A

Quarterfinals

Boxing

Men

Judo

Two judoka were selected as of 24 May 2022.

Men

Para powerlifting

As of 4 May 2022, The Gambia qualified one powerlifter.

Swimming

Men

References

External links
The Gambia National Olympic Committee Official site

Nations at the 2022 Commonwealth Games
The Gambia at the Commonwealth Games
2022 in Gambian sport